William Clarence Rotes (June 27, 1871 – March 7, 1934) was an American professional baseball pitcher. Rotes played for the Louisville Colonels during the 1893 season. He also played in the minor leagues from 1892 to 1898.

Rotes was commonly known as "Bill" and "Poodle". His last name was sometimes spelled "Rhodes" or "Rhoads".

External links

SABR biography

1871 births
1934 deaths
19th-century baseball players
Major League Baseball pitchers
Louisville Colonels players
Johnstown Terrors players
Reading Actives players
Pawtucket Phenoms players
Bloomsburg Blue Jays players
Lockhaven Maroons players
Pawtucket Tigers players
Shamokin Reds players
Bridgeton (minor league baseball) players
Baseball players from Pennsylvania
People from Pottstown, Pennsylvania